Abdul Muntaquim Chaudhury is a Bengali politician, barrister and lawyer. He was a Member of the 3rd National Assembly of Pakistan and the 1st Jatiya Sangsad.

Early life and background
Chaudhury was born in Hailakandi in the Sylhet district of the British Raj's Assam Province. He belonged to an upper-class Bengali Muslim family known as the Zamindars of Kanihati. His elder brother was Abdul Munim Chaudhury. His father, Khan Bahadur Tajammul Ali Chaudhury, was the deputy commissioner and hakim of Sylhet, and the author of the Tawārīkh-i-Halīmī (1894).

Career
Chaudhury was a member of the 3rd National Assembly of Pakistan.

He supported numerous movements at the time such as the Bengali Language Movement and the Six point movement. During the 1970 Pakistani provincial elections, he was elected as a member of the Pakistan National Assembly as an Awami League candidate.

Chaudhury played an organising role during the Bangladesh Liberation War of 1971. Following independence, he was a member of the drafting committee of the Constitution of Bangladesh and played an important role regarding Article 70. He had argued against keeping a provision in the Constitution of Bangladesh that allowed for the expulsion of parliamentary members from parliament if they get expelled from their party.

In the 1973 Bangladeshi elections, Chaudhury won the Sylhet-13 constituency, again as an Awami League candidate. His initial roles with the Government of Bangladesh included serving as the ambassador to Japan, East Germany and South Korea, initiating activities which led to the Textile industry in Bangladesh. Chaudhury's close relationship with Hayakawa made him regarded as the architect of Bangladesh–Japan relations. One of the outcomes of this fruitful relationship was the establishment of the JBIC-funded Pan Pacific Sonargaon hotel in Dhaka.

References

Pakistani MNAs 1962–1965
People from Kulaura Upazila
Awami League politicians
People of East Pakistan
1st Jatiya Sangsad members
20th-century Bangladeshi lawyers
20th-century Pakistani lawyers
Pakistani barristers
Ambassadors of Bangladesh to Japan
Ambassadors of Bangladesh to South Korea
Ambassadors of Bangladesh to Germany
Bangladeshi people of Arab descent
1929 births
Living people